Events in the year 1939 in Bolivia.

Incumbents
President: Germán Busch (until 23 August), Carlos Quintanilla (Interim president) (starting 23 August)
Vice President: Enrique Baldivieso (PSU) (until 24 April), vacant (until 4 December), none (starting 4 December)

Events

 24 April – President Germán Busch dismisses the assembly and declares dictatorial rule.
 23 August – President Germán Busch commits suicide by gunshot. The armed forces appoints the commander-in-chief of the army General Carlos Quintanilla interim president.
6 October – General elections are called for 10 March 1940.
4 December – The office of vice president is abolished by decree in order to circumvent claims of constitutional succession by former vice president Enrique Baldivieso.

Births
15 April – Jaime Paz Zamora, 32nd Vice President of Bolivia, 60th President of Bolivia

Deaths
1 May – Bautista Saavedra, 29th President of Bolivia (b. 1870)
23 August – Germán Busch, 36th President of Bolivia (b. 1904)
12 September – Eliodoro Villazón, 27th President of Bolivia, oldest living state leader to that point (b.1848)

References

 
1930s in Bolivia